Shanaka Madusanka Peters (born ) is a Sri Lankan male weightlifter, competing in the 94 kg category and representing Sri Lanka at international competitions. He participated at the 2014 Commonwealth Games in the 94 kg event. He won the silver medal at the 2016 South Asian Games lifting a total of 300 kg.

Major competitions

References

1991 births
Living people
Sri Lankan male weightlifters
Place of birth missing (living people)
Weightlifters at the 2014 Commonwealth Games
Commonwealth Games competitors for Sri Lanka
Weightlifters at the 2018 Commonwealth Games
South Asian Games silver medalists for Sri Lanka
South Asian Games medalists in weightlifting